Sven Verdonck (born 30 January 1988 in Herentals) is a Belgian football player who plays in the central defence. He currently plays for KFC De Kempen.

Career
In 2007, he went on loan to FC Brussels.

In August 2010 Verdonck was fired by Fortuna when he received a two-year suspension by the KNVB for the use of stanozolol in April 2010. The suspension was confirmed by the FIFA in March 2011.

References

External links
 

1988 births
Living people
Belgian footballers
Association football defenders
K.R.C. Genk players
R.W.D.M. Brussels F.C. players
Fortuna Sittard players
FC Eindhoven players
Belgian Pro League players
Eerste Divisie players
Belgian expatriate footballers
Expatriate footballers in the Netherlands
Belgian expatriate sportspeople in the Netherlands
Doping cases in association football
Belgian sportspeople in doping cases
People from Herentals
Footballers from Antwerp Province